The Bangladesh Jatiya Party is a political party in Bangladesh. It is a splinter group of the original Jatiya Party, that was founded by the former President of Bangladesh Hossain Mohammad Ershad, a military dictator. It was previously known as Jatiya Party (Naziur), after the late party chairman Naziur Rahman Manju (also written as Manzur). Manju was a freedom fighter in the War of Liberation in 1971 and he served as the Local Government Rural Development Minister and Mayor of Dhaka under President HM Ershad. Naziur also served as the secretary general of the Jatiya Party between 1998 and 2001.

After developing policy differences with Jatiya Party chairman HM Ershad in early 2001, Manju formed the Bangladesh Jatiya Party – BJP on 5 August 2001 and maintained the Four Party Alliance led by Bangladesh Nationalist Party – BNP. The party secured four electoral seats in the 8th National Parliament.

In 4-party coalition government (2001–2006)

On 14 January 2004, BJP chairman Naziur Rahman Manjur reminded the prime minister of her commitment in the Jatiya Sangsad to hang the portraits of national leaders, including Bangabandhu Sheikh Mujibur Rahman, at government offices. Jamaat-e-Islami Secretary General Ali Ahsan Mohammad Mujahid objected to Manjur's remarks, saying his party would not support any move to hang Mujib's portrait at government offices. "You (Jamaat) are controversial as razakars for your opposition to the War of Liberation. You don't have any right to suggest anything about the Bangabandhu," an incensed Manjur thundered on hearing Mujahid's comments. Khaleda and other key leaders kept silent, but BNP Standing committee member Khandaker Mosharraf Hossain stepped in to restore calm

Bangladesh Jatiya Party (BJP), on 7 April 2005 blasted the government and the BNP high-ups for harbouring extremist elements and establishing an alternative power centre at Hawa Bhaban. Addressing an extended meeting of its central committee in the capital, the BJP leaders also came down heavily on the government for the price hike of essential commodities and deaths in the Rapid Action Battalion (RAB) custody. In a resolution, the meeting expressed concern over the 'improper formation' of the four-party alliance government and non-implementation of the pledges spelled out in the election manifesto of the alliance.

It said the alliance's election commitment was to separate the judiciary from the executive, give autonomy to the state-owned radio and television, hold Upazila Parishad elections, create employment and control price of essentials. The BJP leaders were critical of BNP, the coalition leader, for not incorporating all partners in the cabinet where only two Jamaat leaders were included from the three other components of the alliance formed before 2001 polls. Many BJP leaders termed Jamaat-e-Islami Bangladesh a fundamentalist force while party chairman Naziur Rahman Manjur without naming any party said the government must take action against the fundamentalist forces. "BNP is patronising the fundamentalist and extremist forces in the country," Manjur told the meeting expressing serious concern over the growth of religious extremism. He said that instead of establishing Islamic values BNP is extending help to the fundamentalist forces.
The BJP leaders also criticised the opposition political parties for creating an anarchic situation in the country through national and international conspiracies. They called upon the government to initiate open dialogue with major political parties on reforms of the election commission and other demands. Leaders of the BJP central committee and 56 district units spoke at the meeting and almost all of them expressed similar views about the coalition government's performances in the last three and a half years. Many BJP leaders demanded that its top brasses take a quick decision whether the party will be with the alliance or not. "BJP is not a leased property of any other party," the BJP chairman said responding to his party leaders' views.

Manjur said, "The government should hold discussions with all on reforms of the existing election system and other demands raised by different quarters." Manjur, also expressed his frustration over the rise of political violence and held all political parties responsible for the situation. He blamed the government for its failure to keep the prices of essentials under control. "People will reject BNP if it fails to reduce the price hikes," he said. Pointing to a senior minister's recent statement about negligible hike in rice price, the BJP chief said, "Don't tell lie about the prices of essentials. Visit the kitchen markets and give statements whether prices have increased or not." Referring to the killings in RAB custody, Manjur said the extra- judicial killings have to be stopped.  Several BJP leaders blamed BNP for establishing an alternative power centre at Hawa Bhaban. Advocate Abdul Halim from Sylhet said BNP has introduced a dual rule by the Prime Minister's Office and the Hawa Bhaban.

Current situation
At present, the party is registered with the Election Commission of Bangladesh as Bangladesh Jatiya Party-BJP, to differentiate it from the splinter group Bangladesh Jatiya Party formerly led by M.A. Matin. The party, at present, is chaired by Barrister Andaleeve Rahman Partho MP, son of late Naziur Rahman Manjur. Andaleeve along with his younger brother Dr. Ashikur Rahman Shanto contested in the 9th parliamentary elections from Bhola-1 and Bhola-2.

On 29 November 2013, Ashikur Rahman – a member of the Central Committee of the party and son of late Naziur Rahman Manzur – cited irreconcilable ideological differences with the party's coalition with the BNP-led 18 Party which also included Jamaat-e-Islam.  He stated in an interview, "I think the time has come for all political parties to leave Jamaat-e-Islam ... I do not want to continue politics with Jamaat". He further argued, "We should not compromise with any undemocratic and anti-liberation forces. My father [late Naziur Rahman Manju who founded the party] was a freedom fighter. So, I cannot be a part of any alliance that is involved with Jamaat."

BJP Chairperson Barrister Andaleeve Rahman Partho, however, argued: "Ashik does not want to continue with destructive politics and so left the party. But, the country needs brilliant people like him."

In May 2019, the party left BNP-led 20 Party Alliance.

See also 
 Bangla Jatiya Dal

References

 
Political parties in Bangladesh
2001 establishments in Bangladesh